Pritam Debnath (born 25 July 1987) is an Indian cricketer. He is a right-handed batsman who plays for Assam. He was born in Guwahati.

Debnath made his cricketing debut in 2006–07, for Assam Under-22s, playing one game each in the 2006–07 and 2007–08 seasons.

Debnath made his first-class debut in the Ranji Trophy competition of 2008–09, against Vidarbha. From the opening order, he scored a golden duck in the first innings of the match and 7 runs in the second.

External links
Pritam Debnath at CricketArchive 
 

1987 births
Living people
Indian cricketers
Assam cricketers
Cricketers from Guwahati